Ramiseto is a frazione of the comune (municipality) of Ventasso in the Province of Reggio Emilia in the Italian region Emilia-Romagna, located about  west of Bologna and about  southwest of Reggio Emilia.  It was a separate comune until 1 January 2016.

References

Cities and towns in Emilia-Romagna